Maduka Emilio Okoye (born 28 August 1999) is a Nigerian professional footballer who plays as a goalkeeper for EFL Championship club Watford and the Nigeria national team.

Early life
Okoye was born in Düsseldorf to an Igbo Nigerian father and a German mother.

Club career

Fortuna Düsseldorf II
In the summer of 2017, he left the youth team of Bayer Leverkusen, where he had played since 2009 to join the youth team of Fortuna Düsseldorf.

On 14 October 2017, he made his professional debut in the Regionalliga West for Fortuna Düsseldorf II in a game against Wuppertaler SV, replacing the injured Max Schijns on the 43rd minute of the game. He finished the 2017/2018 season with 5 appearances, conceding just 1 goal and keeping 4 clean sheets, while his club finished the season in the 15th position with 36 points after 34 games, narrowly escaping relegation to Oberliga.

In the 2018/2019 season, he became the clubs regular goalkeeper. On 13 April 2019, he played his last match of the season, against SV Rödinghausen, after being replaced in goal for the next matches by goalkeeper Jannick Theissen. He finished the season with 15 appearances, conceding 25 goals and keeping 3 clean sheets. This time, his club did better than the previous season, finishing the season in the 12th position with 42 points after 34 games.

On 24 August 2019, he played his first match of the 2019/2020 season in a 2–1 home win against Schalke 04 II.

Sparta Rotterdam
In July 2020, Okoye signed for Eredivise side Sparta Rotterdam on a free transfer. He was named Sparta's Player of the Season, keeping 10 clean sheets in 28 league games during the 2020/21 season. On 4 August 2021, Okoye signed a contract extension until 2025.

Watford
On 8 November 2021, it was announced that Okoye had agreed to join Premier League outfit Watford on a five-and-a-half year deal for an undisclosed fee. Okoye joined Watford on 1 January 2022. The deal saw Okoye loaned back to Sparta Rotterdam until the end of the 2021–22 campaign. Okoye made his Watford debut on 23 August 2022 in a 2-0 home defeat to MK Dons in the second round of the EFL Cup.

International career 
On 30 November 2017, the coach of the
Nigerian National Team, Gernot Rohr talked about his plans to invite Maduka to the Nigerian National Team before the 2018 World Cup, but the plan wasn't a success.

On 20 February 2019, during an interview conducted by German based Nigerian sports journalist, Oma Akatugba, Maduka hinted that he's open to invitation by the Nigerian National Team, and ever willing to wear the green and white.

On 22 February 2019, he was invited to the Nigerian U23 Team for the 2019 African U-23 Cup of Nations qualifier against Libya U-23 by Imama Amapakabo, the coach of the Nigeria U23 Team, but failed to make a debut, due to club engagement.

On 9 May 2019, Maduka was again invited to the Nigerian U23 Team for the 2019 African U-23 Cup of Nations qualifier against Sudan U-23. The football match was originally scheduled to take place between 3 and 11 June 2019, but was moved to September 2–10 2019 by CAF, the postponement was motivated by the closeness of the qualifying games to the 2019 Africa Cup of Nations which held from 21 June to 19 July 2019, in Egypt.

On 26 July 2019, the coach of the
Nigerian National Team, Gernot Rohr, hinted that he is shifting his focus to Maduka as he looks to solve the goalkeeping crisis that has rocked his team since Carl Ikeme quit due to illness.

On 14 August 2019, Rohr invited Maduka for a friendly against Ukraine, that will be played on 10 September 2019 in Dnipro-Arena.

On 13 October 2019, he made his international debut as a substitute in a friendly match against Brazil ending 1–1.

On 25 December 2021, He was shortlisted in 2021 AFCON Nations Cup by Caretaker Coach Eguavoen as part of the 28-Man Nigeria Squad

Career statistics

Club

International

References

External links

1999 births
Living people
Footballers from Düsseldorf
Citizens of Nigeria through descent
Nigerian footballers
Nigeria international footballers
German footballers
Nigerian people of German descent
German sportspeople of Nigerian descent
Fortuna Düsseldorf II players
Sparta Rotterdam players
Regionalliga players
Eredivisie players
2021 Africa Cup of Nations players
Nigerian expatriate footballers
Expatriate footballers in the Netherlands
Nigerian expatriate sportspeople in the Netherlands
Association football goalkeepers